Eva Lian (born 5 September 1956 in Hof, Vestfold) is a Norwegian politician for the Centre Party.

She was elected to the Norwegian Parliament from Vestfold in 1993, but was not re-elected in 1997.

Lian served as mayor of Ramnes municipality from 1987 to 1993.

References

1956 births
Living people
Members of the Storting
Women members of the Storting
Centre Party (Norway) politicians
Mayors of places in Vestfold
People from Re, Norway
People from Hof, Vestfold
20th-century Norwegian politicians
20th-century Norwegian women politicians
Women mayors of places in Norway